was a Japanese professional wrestling event co-promoted by Big Japan Pro Wrestling (BJW), DDT Pro-Wrestling (DDT), Ice Ribbon, Kaientai Dojo (K-Dojo) and Pro Wrestling Freedoms. The event, held on December 31, 2010, at Korakuen Hall in Tokyo, Japan featured sixteen matches and aired on Fighting TV Samurai.

The event was headlined by a 5-on-5 elimination match pitting the team of Harashima, Shuji Ishikawa, Yoshihito Sasaki, Fujita "Jr." Hayato and Emi Sakura against Kengo Mashimo, Yuko Miyamoto, Mammoth Sasaki, Munenori Sawa and Kazuhiro Tamura. Other prominent features saw a one night eight-person single elimination tournament where all the matches were fought with a three minutes time limit, and a 34-person rumble rules battle royal in which each participant represented a different promotion by bringing a weapon symbolic of that promotion.

Production

Background
The tradition of holding a joint event for smaller promotions on New Year's Eve at Korakuen Hall started with the 2006 Indy Summit. After two Pro-Wrestling Summits in 2007 and 2008, and the special edition of Tenka Sanbun no Kei in 2009, the New Year's Eve Pro-Wrestling brand returned in 2010, this time with the addition of Ice Ribbon and Pro Wrestling Freedoms as the main producers.

Storylines
The show featured sixteen professional wrestling matches that resulted from scripted storylines, where wrestlers portray villains, heroes, or less distinguishable characters in the scripted events that build tension and culminate in a wrestling match or series of matches.

One Night Tournament bracket

Results

Symbolic Weapon Rumble entrances and eliminations
 – Winner

5-on-5 elimination match

References

Notes

Footnotes

2010 in professional wrestling
Active Advance Pro Wrestling
Big Japan Pro Wrestling shows
DDT Pro-Wrestling shows
Ice Ribbon
Professional wrestling in Tokyo
Holidays themed professional wrestling events